The Addicks Reservoir and Addicks Dam in conjunction with the Barker Reservoir prevent downstream flooding of Buffalo Bayou in the City of Houston, Texas.  Both reservoirs were authorized under the Rivers and Harbors Act of June 20, 1938, which was modified by the Flood Control Acts of August 11, 1938; September 3, 1954; and October 27, 1965. The U.S. Army Corps of Engineers completed construction of Addicks Dam and the outlet facility in 1948.

Location
Addicks Reservoir is situated on the north side of Interstate 10. It extends slightly north of Clay Road, and between Barker-Cypress Road to the west and Sam Houston Tollway to the east. State Highway 6 bisects the reservoir north to south. In addition to the Reservoir's flood damage reduction mission, recreation and nature observation opportunities abound through the approximately 26,000 acres (105 km²) of land that makes up Addicks and Barker reservoirs, which are often dry wooded areas in normal times. The West Houston Airport is located within the western edge of the Addicks reservoir, between Barker-Cypress Road and State Highway 6.

The Addicks Reservoir spillway is located at, and releases the remainder of Bear Creek just north of Buffalo Bayou.

Addicks Reservoir and Dam get their name from the former town of Addicks, Texas, named after its original postmaster, Henry Addicks.

Construction
A  gravel road extends along the top of the dam.

During Hurricane Harvey, the level peaked at 109.1 feet on August 30, 2017; this is the highest recorded level for Addicks Reservoir. Water retention at this level was 217,500 acre feet.

From 2008 to 2014, the U.S. Army Corps of Engineers Galveston District implemented $4.4 million in interim risk reduction measures (at Addicks and Barker dams) to address deficiencies until long-term solutions could be identified and executed. In 2014, staff completed a Dam Safety Modification Study to evaluate long-term repairs and address issues associated with the dams. Staff presented this information during a public meeting Oct. 29 at Bear Creek Community Center in Houston to discuss these plans and gather feedback. Construction is scheduled to begin May 2015 with an estimated completion date of 2019.

The northern and western ends of the dam consist of roller-compacted concrete spillways.  The existing ground at either end of Addicks Dam is lower than the top of dam elevation. Existing ground at the north end of Addicks Dam is at elevation 108 feet and ties into the concrete spillway crest at 112.5 feet. The existing ground at the western end is at elevation of 111.0 feet and ties into the concrete spillway which has a crest of 115.5 feet.  (All elevations are NAVD 1988.)

Controlled release
On August 28, 2017, during flooding from Hurricane Harvey, the U.S. Army Corps of Engineers began controlled water releases at both the Addicks and Barker Reservoirs, in an attempt to manage flood levels in the immediate area. The waters continued to rise, and on August 29, after reaching pool elevation over 108 feet above NAVD 1988, the Addicks Reservoir began around the end of the dam near Tanner Rd. Flows less than 100 cubic feet per second were detected at the spillway. In the afternoon of August 29, 2017, the Army Corps of Engineers made the decision to raise the controlled release rates to 16,000 cubic feet per second. As of August 30, 2017, combined controlled discharge rates of Barker and Addicks were 13,700 cubic feet per second, and subdivisions surrounding the outlets and downstream past Beltway 8 experienced significantly increased flooding as Buffalo Bayou further overtopped its banks.

Benefits
It is estimated the Addicks and Barker Reservoirs, along with other federal construction projects on Buffalo Bayou and its tributaries, prevent average annual flood damages of $16,372,000 to the city of Houston.

Recreation
Several parks are scattered throughout the reservoir, including Bear Creek Pioneers Park along with hike/bike/horse trails. There is a paved bicycle trail going alongside the reservoir, with the trail head being located next to Sherwood Elementary School.

Development controversy
When the Addicks and Barker Reservoirs were originally constructed, the Army Corps of Engineers acquired approximately 24,500 acres of land even though at the time it was known that an additional 8,000 acres could be inundated at full pool. Initially these additional acres were largely agricultural land where the consequences of flooding would be minimal. Harris County and Houston City authorities permitted developers to build residential neighborhoods (such as the Lakes on Eldridge Subdivision) on this privately-owned land within the basins of the reservoirs. Today about 14,000 homes are located inside the reservoir basins. Many residents complained after Hurricane Harvey that they were not informed that their homes were located inside a reservoir basin. Beginning in the 1990s, Fort Bend County, which contains a portion of Barker Reservoir, began requiring that plat documents for land within the basin carry a one-sentence disclosure of possible “controlled inundation”.

Government-Induced Flooding and Ensuing Litigation
During and after Hurricane Harvey, 7,000 acres of private upstream land was deliberately submerged by the U.S. Army Corps of Engineers operation of the Addicks and Barker dams and reservoirs. In response, Upstream property owners filed a series of lawsuits in The U.S. Court of Federal Claims (CFC) seeking to hold the U.S. government liable for the induced flooding under the “takings clause” of the Fifth Amendment. 

Given the large number of lawsuits, the CFC decided to handle the cases as a group by using case management methods commonly employed in multi-district litigation. To that end, and after considering hundreds of applications, the CFC appointed attorneys Armistead "Armi" Easterby, Daniel Charest, and Charles Irvine to serve as Co-Lead trial counsel for upstream plaintiffs. The CFC also selected 13 property owners for a bellwether trial to determine causation and liability issues common to the Upstream property owners. 

Federal Claims Judge Charles Lettow presided over the May 2019 liability trial, which was held in Houston, Texas. On December 17, 2019, the CFC held that the upstream flooding constituted a Fifth Amendment taking. The decision detailed how U.S. government officials knowingly and intentionally imposed flooding on upstream private property, and that the victims living near the federally owned reservoirs did not know their property was in a federal flood-control project’s reservoir flood pool. During trial, government lawyers stated this litigation is the largest Fifth Amendment “takings” case in United States history.

In June 2022, Judge Lettow presided over a 2-week trial addressing the amounts owed to 6 bellwether plaintiffs by the United States under the Fifth Amendment’s takings clause. In October 2022, the CFC issued its just compensation decision finding in favor of the bellwether plaintiffs. The 6 bellwether plaintiffs received awards for decreased real property values, damaged or destroyed personal property, and costs for the owners being displaced. Total compensation for the ~10,000 upstream property owners who suffered government-induced flooding could reach or exceed $1.7 billion before interest. The 6-year statute of limitations for filing a lawsuit in the CFC is set to expire in August 2023.

Buffalo Bayou & Tributaries Resiliency Study Interim Report
In October 2020, the U.S. Army Corps of Engineers published an Interim Report regarding the Addicks and Barker dams and reservoirs. The Interim Report states that high reservoir water levels resulting from the Army Corp's operation of the Addicks and Barker dams "pose unacceptable risks to health and human safety, private property, and public infrastructure," and that "future economic damages from flooding are likely" in the upstream area. The Interim Report further indicates that there is inadequate government-owned real estate for dam operations, as more than 20,000 homes and 24,000 parcels of privately-owned upstream land are within the areas subject to government-induced flooding. The total acquisition cost to acquire these lands would be approximately $10 billion.

References

External links
 
 
 Addicks, Texas, and Bear Creek

Geography of Houston
Reservoirs in Texas
Protected areas of Harris County, Texas
Dams in Texas
United States Army Corps of Engineers dams
Bodies of water of Harris County, Texas
Dams completed in 1948